Weißenborn (or Weissenborn) is a municipality in the Werra-Meißner-Kreis in Hesse, Germany.

Geography

Location
Weißenborn lies in the North Hesse Uplands some 8 km (as the crow flies) southeast of Eschwege and abuts a section of the boundary with Thuringia. It is found in the Schlierbachswald, onto which borders the Ringgau (ranges) not far south of the community. Not far southwest of Weißenborn (elevation: 280 m above sea level) stands the Rabenkuppe (514.8 m above sea level), and just under 6 km (as the crow flies) east of the community, on the Thuringian side of the state boundary, is the Heldrastein (503.8 m above sea level).

Neighbouring communities
Weißenborn borders in the north on the town of Treffurt, in the east on the community of Ifta (both in Thuringia’s Wartburgkreis), in the south on the community of Ringgau, in the west on the community of Wehretal and in the northwest on the town of Eschwege (all three in the Werra-Meißner-Kreis).

Constituent communities
Weißenborn’s Ortsteile are Weißenborn and Rambach.

History
Archaeological finds bear witness to people having lived in the area that is now Weißenborn as early as about 2000 BC. The community itself had its first documentary mention in 1365.

Politics

Community council

The municipal election held on 26 March 2006 yielded the following results:

Economy and infrastructure

Transport
Over Bundesstraßen 7 (Kassel-Eisenach) and 250 (Wanfried-Creuzburg), the community is linked to the highway network.

References

Werra-Meißner-Kreis